Azumasan Maru was a 7,623-gross register ton freighter that was built by Mitsui Bussan Kaisha, Tama for Mitsui Bussan Kaisha launched in 1933. She was requisitioned by the Imperial Japanese Navy and fitted out as a troop transport.

She was part of the invasion fleet that landed troops during the invasion of Tulagi on 3 May 1942. She was anchored at Purvis Bay, Florida Island when the Tulagi invasion fleet was attacked by aircraft of the United States Navy's aircraft carrier , with Azumasan Maru being damaged in the attack.

Azumasan Maru left Rabaul in a convoy to resupply Guadalcanal. Disembarkation began near Bunani Point  on 15 October. The ships of the convoy came under bombardment from SBD Dauntless dive bombers and even a torpedo attack by a PBY Catalina Flying Boat from Henderson Field. The ship was beached to prevent sinking after suffering severe damage.

See also
 Foreign commerce and shipping of Empire of Japan

References

External links
 Azumasan Maru
 Chronological List of Japanese Merchant Vessel Losses

1933 ships
Auxiliary ships of the Imperial Japanese Navy
Ships sunk by US aircraft
Ships built by Mitsui Engineering and Shipbuilding